Flucard is a wireless SD card that is used primarily with digital cameras. The Flucard is manufactured by Trek 2000 International, which is the Singaporean company that is one of the purported inventors of the ThumbDrive technology.

Features 
The Flucard is designed to work with any device that has an SD host slot. Once it is plugged in, the device will gain Wi-Fi capabilities and be able to wirelessly send files to other Wi-Fi enabled devices. Additionally, users can wirelessly upload files from the host device to the Flucard Portal or any other server of their choice.

History 
In 2005, Henn Tan, the chief executive officer and chairman of Trek 2000 International, was on an overseas trip with his family in China. On the third day of the tour, Tan's daughter's camera went missing. Tan would later recount that it was not so much the cost of the equipment but the loss of three days' worth of invaluable memories that affected him. Out of this ordeal, however, came the idea for a new product. Tan saw the potential for a better way to quickly and effectively store and protect such data on-the-go. When he got back to Singapore, Tan committed the company's research and development team to create an "intelligent" SD card that could wirelessly transmit files.

In 2008 the Flucard started to materialize. The name "Flucard" was purportedly chosen as Tan believes that the adoption of the Flucard would spread like a contagious flu, eventually displacing the standard SD card. Trek is one of the claimants to the invention of the Thumb Drive, the disruptive technology that replaced the floppy disk as the medium-of-choice for digital storage.

In 2010, Trek, together with its long-time partner, Toshiba, jointly launched the forum "Standard Promotion Forum for Memory Cards Embedding Wireless LAN" to promote the adoption of the Flucard.

Specifications 

 Capacity: 8 GB
 SD interface: SD memory Card Physical Layer Version 2.00
 Wireless interface: 802.11b/g/n Wi-Fi technology
 Wireless security: WEP 64/128, WPA, WPA2
 Wireless range: Camera to Wi-Fi devices: 20 m (typical); Camera to camera: up to 6 m (camera model applies)
 Dimensions: 32 mm (L) × 24 mm (W) × 2.1 mm (H)
 Weight: 4 g
 Antenna: Internal
 Buzzer: In-built buzzer
 SD performance: Class 6 (sequential write: no less than 6 MBytes/s)
 Wireless performance: Max connection rate: 65 Mbit/s; transfer speed: up to 2 MBytes/s

Supporting applications

See also 
 Pentax FluCard
 Eye-Fi, a similar Wi-Fi SD card
 PHS CF, a PHS wireless modem technology based on CompactFlash cards

References 

Computer storage devices